Miriam Nathan-Roberts is a contemporary artist who specializes in designing quilts. She has won best in show twice at Quilt National in 1982 and 1989.  Her artwork has featured in Art/Quilt Magazine, Quilter's Newsletter, and American Quilter, along with many books including America's Glorious Quilts. In 2005 she served as one of three judges of the Quilt National show.

References

External links 
 Official website
 Biography
 PBS-Quilts: Moments in Time PBS special on quilting
 Quilt National

American artists
Living people
Quilters
Year of birth missing (living people)